David Tarnas is an American politician who is currently the Hawaii state representative in Hawaii's 7th district. Tarnas first served as the State Representative for Kohala and Kona from 1994-1998. After a 20 year break from politics, he won the 7th district seat by defeating incumbent Democrat Cindy Evans in a primary election, going on to win the general election. He previously ran in a primary against Evans for the same seat in 2016, losing that primary 52.1% to 47.9%. He has since won the Democratic primary and general elections in 2020 and 2022, chairing the Water, Land & Hawaiian Affairs Committee from 2021-2022.and the Judiciary & Hawaiian Affairs Committee in 2023.

Tarnas holds a master's degree in marine affairs from the University of Washington (1985) and a bachelor's degree in political science from Kalamazoo College (1982).

Tenure
Tarnas opposes term limits for state legislators "singlehandedly torpedo[ing]" one of the proposals of the House Commission to Improve Standards of Conduct.

References

Democratic Party members of the Hawaii House of Representatives
21st-century American politicians
People from Hawaii (island)
Living people
Year of birth missing (living people)